Manfred Pohlschmidt (born 27 August 1940) is a retired German football player.

Career
Pohlschmidt started his Bundesliga career with SC Preußen Münster in the 1963–64 season, the club's only season in the Bundesliga. During his career he also played for Hamburger SV and FC Schalke 04 in the Bundesliga, and he played in the 1967 DFB-Pokal Final with HSV. In 1971, he retired from professional football.

Personal
Pohlschmidt's brother, Bernhard, was also a footballer who played in the Bundesliga with SC Preußen Münster.

References

External links
 

1940 births
Living people
German footballers
Bundesliga players
FC Schalke 04 players
SC Preußen Münster players
Hamburger SV players
Sportspeople from Münster
Association football midfielders
Footballers from North Rhine-Westphalia